Stavros Plakidis ; May 22, 1893 – January 1, 1991) was an astronomer, professor, astrophysicist, mathematician, author, and director of the Astronomical Institute of the National Observatory of Athens and intermittently served as chairman of the National Observatory.  He is considered the father of modern astronomy in Greece.  Plakidis made systematic observations of variable stars, novae, planets (Mars, Jupiter, Saturn, and Mercury), minor planets, stellar parallaxes, orbits of comets, and double stars, also contributing to the accurate geographic coordinates of the Athens Observatory.  Plakidas independently discovered V1500 Cygni several hours after Minoru Honda claimed the find in Japan.
  
Plakidis was born in Constantinople.  He attended the University of Athens and became an assistant astronomer at the National Observatory under Demetrios Eginitis eventually traveling to Europe to study in Italy, France, Germany, and England.  While in England he collaborated with Arthur Eddington on a paper entitled the Irregularities of the Period of Long-Period Variable Stars and by 1931 Plakidis was awarded a Ph.D.  He returned to Greece and became an astronomy professor at the University of Athens.  He also worked at the National Observatory of Athens remaining at both institutions until 1964.
 
Plakidis was honored by countless international institutions for his work in the field of astronomy.  He helped erect the Penteli Observatory and added a solar physics section to the National Observatory of Athens while also modernizing the instrumentation.  He continued his research on variable stars throughout his life publishing articles in dozens of international publications. He was a member of the Société astronomique de France, French Association of Variable Star Observers, Royal Astronomical Society, and British Astronomical Association. Plakidis also frequently attended meetings of the International Astronautical Federation. He was the first director of the Evgenides Planetarium.  He died in Athens Greece at the age of 97.

Biography
Plakidis was born in Constantinople.  He finished his early education in Constantinople in 1911 at the Great School of the Nation.  He migrated to Athens and graduated from the School of Physics and Mathematics of the University of Athens in 1915. One of his professors included  Demetrios Eginitis.  Plakidis was appointed assistant at the National Observatory of Athens from 1915 to 1928.  He also became a lab administrator at the astronomical lab of the University of Athens.  Eginitis was the director of the facility.  Because of his academic achievements in the field of astronomy, Plakidis received a scholarship and spent two years at different European observatories.  He traveled to Italy, the German city Heidelberg and the French cities of  Paris, Meudon, and Lyon.  He also visited the English cities of Greenwich and Cambridge constantly participating in astronomical research.  While he was at Cambridge he studied with Professor Sir Arthur Eddington.  Plakidis and Eddington published a paper entitled the Irregularities of the Period of Long-Period Variable Stars which attracted international attention and by 1931 Plakidis was awarded a Ph.D.  He returned to Athens and was awarded a position at the University of Athens after the death of Eginitis in 1934. Around the same period, he became the director of the Astronomical Institute of the National Observatory and frequently served as chairman of the National Observatory.

While he worked at the National Observatory of Athens he developed new instruments and added a section for solar physics.  One year before the Space Race began in 1954 Plakidis spent one year at the Yerkes Observatory in the United States of America.  He also participated in the establishment of the Penteli Observatory containing a 63 cm Newall telescope which was donated by Cambridge University in 1955 because of Plakidis's lifelong research relationship with Sir Arthur Eddington.  Plakidis continued his research on variable stars throughout his life writing papers for different local and international publications.  He published books on spherical astronomy, astrophysics, and practical astronomy.  He was an observational astronomer.  Some of his observations were published in the Annals of the Academy of Athens, Annales de l'Observatoire National d'Athenes, Royal Astronomical Society, Harvard College Observatory Bulletin, Astronomische Nachrichten, Journal des Observateurs, Ciel et Terre, Comptes rendus de l'Académie des Sciences, and Bulletin de l'Observatoire de Lyon.

He made systematic observations on variable stars, double stars, novae, solar eclipses, stellar parallaxes, and the planets Mars, Jupiter, Saturn, and Mercury.  He was the first director of the Evgenides Planetarium and developed the facility. He retired in 1964 and became honorary director of the Astronomical Institute and emeritus professor at the University of Athens.  He continued observational astronomy until his death. In 1974, he independently discovered V1500 Cygni several hours after Minoru Honda registered the discovery in Japan.  That same year he was honored by a publication of his works entitled In honorem S. Placidis :special volume dedicated to Professor S. Plakidis on his 80th birthday.  He died on January 30, 1991, at 97 years old.

Publications

References

Bibliography

20th-century Greek mathematicians
20th-century Greek educators
20th-century Greek scientists
20th-century Greek astronomers
20th-century Greek physicists
Greek astronomers
Academic staff of the National and Kapodistrian University of Athens
Writers from Athens
1893 births
1991 deaths
Constantinopolitan Greeks
Academics from Istanbul
Writers from Istanbul
Scientists from Istanbul